Donohoe or O'Donohoe is an Irish surname, reduced Anglicized form of Gaelic Ó Donnchadha ‘descendant of Donnchadh’, a personal name (sometimes Anglicized as Duncan in Scotland), composed of the elements donn = ‘brown-haired man’ or ‘chieftain’ + cath = ‘battle’.

Spelling variations (which may include an initial O' or omit it) include Donoghue, Donaghoe, Donaho, Donahoe, Donough, Donahue, Donahow, Doneghoe, Donehue, Donighue, Donoho, Donahugh, Donohough, Donohow, Donohue, Donaughue, Dunphy, Donaghie, Donaghy and many more.

First found in County Kerry, Ireland, where they held a family seat from very ancient times.

The Scottish Clan Robertson, anciently known as Clann Dhònnchaidh, 'Children of Dònnchadh' or Duncan, is of separate origin.

Notable people with the surname include:

Amanda Donohoe, English actress
Elinor Donahue, Irish-American actress best known from the television shows Father Knows Best and The Andy Griffith Show
John Donahoe, President and CEO of Nike
John E. O'Donoghue, Major League Baseball pitcher
John P. O'Donoghue, Major League Baseball pitcher
Lowitja O'Donoghue, Aboriginal Australian civil rights activist
Martin O'Donoghue, Irish economist and Fianna Fáil politician
Michael O'Donoghue, Irish-American comedian, writer and occasional performer for Saturday Night Live
Patrick O'Donoghue, Irish-born current Roman Catholic Bishop of Lancaster in England
Peter Donohoe (disambiguation)
Peter O'Donoghue (disambiguation), multiple people
Patrick R. Donahoe, the 73rd Postmaster General of the United States
Phil Donahue, Irish-American journalist and talk show host
Thomas Donohoe, Scottish immigrant, pioneer of football in Brazil

Anglicised Irish-language surnames